Precis andremiaja is a butterfly in the family Nymphalidae. It is found on Madagascar. The habitat consists of forest margins and anthropogenic environments. J. andremiaja is said by Mr. Cowan to be "common in houses on warm days".

The word andremiaja seems to be etymologically a Malagasy word. The root -miaja means to honor, to respect while andre-sequence, unknown in Malagasy, can be a strain of Andria- which would give Malagasy Andriamiaja, a fairly common surname.

References

External links
Image from Museum of Comparative Zoology
Identification for P. andremiaja male and female

Butterflies described in 1833
Junoniini